Małków may refer to the following places:
Malków, Łódź Voivodeship (central Poland)
Małków, Łódź Voivodeship (central Poland)
Małków, Hrubieszów County in Lublin Voivodeship (east Poland)
Małków, Łęczna County in Lublin Voivodeship (east Poland)
Małków, Masovian Voivodeship (east-central Poland)